Fuente-Higuera is a village in the municipality of Molinicos, province of Albacete, in the autonomous community of Castile–La Mancha, Spain.  

Populated places in the Province of Albacete